Food contact materials are materials that are intended to be in contact with food. These can be things that are quite obvious like a glass or a can for soft drinks as well as machinery in a food factory or a coffee machine.

Food contact materials can be constructed from a variety of materials, including plastics, rubber, paper, coatings, metal, etc. In many cases, a combination is used; for example, a carton box for juices can include (from the inside to the outside) a plastic layer, aluminum, paper, printing, and top coating.

During contact with the food, molecules can migrate from the food contact material to the food, for example, via blooming. Because of this, in many countries, regulations are made to ensure food safety.

Food safe symbol

The international symbol for "food safe" material is a wine glass and a fork symbol. The symbol indicates that the material used in the product is considered safe for food contact. This includes food and water containers, packaging materials, cutlery etc. The regulation is applicable to any product intended for food contact whether it be made of metals, ceramics, paper and board, and plastics or the coating. Use of the symbol is more significant in products which should be explicitly identified whether food safe or not, i.e. wherever there is an ambiguity whether the container could be used to hold foodstuffs. The symbol is used in North America, Europe and parts of Asia. It is mandatory for products sold in Europe after the Framework Regulation EC 1935/2004.

Even though the legal requirement in various nations would be different, the food safe symbol generally assures that:
 The container surface is free of any toxic contaminants which could be contacted from the manufacturing process.
 The container material shall not potentially become a source of toxic contamination through usage (degeneration). This is assured by estimating and regulating the "migration limits" of the material. In EU regulation, the overall migration is limited to 10 mg of substances/dm² of the potential contact surface. The specific migration for various materials would be different for different temperature levels (of food as well as storage) and for different food items depending on variables such as pH of the food stuff. The toxicity considerations of a specific material may include the carcinogenity of the substance. The regulations governing these aspects may vary in different nations.

Note that the "food safe" symbol doesn't guarantee food safety under all conditions. The composition of materials contacting foodstuffs aren't the only factor controlling carcinogen migration into foodstuffs; there are other factors that can have a significant role in food safety. Examples include: the temperature of food products, the fat content of the food products and total time of contact with a surface. The safety of foam food containers is currently debated and is a good example of all three of these factors at play. Polystyrene may melt when in contact with hot or fatty foods and may pose a safety risk. In the United States, materials in contact with food may not contain more than 1% residual styrene monomers by weight (0.5% for fatty foods).

Bisphenol A Diglycidyl ether-based epoxy coatings are extensively used for coating the inside of cans which come into contact with food and are thus food contact materials. The materials and analogues and conjugates have been extensively tested for and analytical methods developed.

Legislation

European Union 
The framework Regulation (EC) No. 1935/2004 applies to all food contact materials. Article 3 contains general safety requirements such as not endanger human health, no unacceptable change in the composition and no deterioration of the organoleptic characteristics. Article 4 set out special requirements for active and intelligent materials. Article 5 specifies measures for groups of materials that may be detailed in separate regulations of directives. Member States may maintain or adopt national provisions (Article 6). Articles 7–14 and 22–23 deal with the requirements and application for authorisation of a substance, modification of authorisation, the role of the European Food Safety Authority, the Member States and the Community. Article 15 is about labeling of food contact materials not yet in contact with food. Article 16 requires a declaration of compliance and appropriate documentation that demonstrate compliance. Articles 17–21 deal with traceability, safeguard measures, public access of applications, confidentiality, and data sharing. Article 24 sets out the inspection and control measures.

Specific measures for materials and articles such as ceramics, regenerated cellulose, plastics, gaskets and active and intelligent materials, and substances such as vinyl chloride, N-nitrosamines and N-nitrostable substances in rubber, and epoxy derivatives, exist.

EU No 10/2011 is applicable regulation for all the Food contact material or Article made up of Plastics.

United States 

The U.S. Food and Drug Administration (FDA) considers three different types of food additives:
 Direct food additives – components added directly to the food
 Secondary direct food additives – components that are added to the food due to food treatment like treating food with ionic resins, solvent extraction
 Indirect food additives – substances that may come into contact with food as part of packaging or processing equipment, but are not intended to be added directly to food

The food contact materials are described in the Code of Federal Legislation (CFR): 21 CFR 174 – 21 CFR 190. Important starting points are:
 21 CFR 175 Indirect food additives: Adhesives and components of coatings
 21 CFR 176 Indirect food additives: Paper and paperboard components
 21 CFR 177 Indirect food additives: Polymers

To this materials additives may be added. Which additives depend on the additive and on the material in which it is intended to be used. There must be a reference to the paragraph in which the additive is mentioned and the restrictions (for example only to be used in polyolefines) and limitations (max 0.5% in the final product) must be respected. See below for part in which additives are described: 21 CFR 170 Food additives
 21 CFR 171 Food additive petitions
 21 CFR 172 Food additives permitted for direct addition to food for human consumption
 21 CFR 173 Secondary direct food additives permitted in food for human consumption
 21 CFR 178 Indirect food additives: Adjuvants, production aids, and sanitizers
 21 CFR 180 Food additives permitted in food or in contact with food on an interim basis pending additional study

Polymers or additives can also be regulated in other ways with exemptions; for example:
 Threshold of regulation
 Food contact notification
 Private letters
 Prior sanctioned food ingredient
 Generally recognized as safe (GRAS)

See also

Food safety
Packaging and labeling
List of food labeling regulations
Disposable food packaging
Disposable cup

References

Further reading
LFGB Article 30 & 31 (German regulations)

Food law
Materials
Food safety